Internet universality is a concept and framework adopted by UNESCO in 2015 to summarize their positions on the Internet. The concept recognizes that "the Internet is much more than infrastructure and applications, it is a network of economic and social interactions and relationships, which has the potential to enable human rights, empower individuals and communities, and facilitate sustainable development. The concept is based on four principles stressing the Internet should be human rights-based, open, accessible, and based on the multistakeholder participation. These have been abbreviated as the R-O-A-M principles. Understanding the Internet in this way helps to draw together different facets of Internet development, concerned with technology and public policy, rights and development."

Through the concept of Internet universality, UNESCO highlights four separate but interdependent fields of Internet policy and practice that are considered key to assess a better Internet environment: access to information and knowledge, freedom of expression, privacy, and ethical norms and behavior online.

A framework named ROAM was developed by UNESCO in order to investigate and evaluate the universality of the Internet in different countries. The framework is based on four normative principles agreed on by UNESCO member states: human rights, openness, accessibility and multi-stakeholder participation, summarized in the acronym R-O-A-M. The principles represent a solid ground for UNESCO in order to create a tool to comprehend Internet governance, the Internet Universality indicators.

History 
The term was agreed on by UNESCO's General Conference in 2015 as a means to integrate UNESCO's work, in the framework of the World Summit on the Information Society (WSIS). It is part of UNESCO's project to fulfill the 2030 Agenda for Sustainable Development. During the 37th session of the General Conference, UNESCO Member States affirmed the principle of applicability of human rights in cyberspace. The concept of Internet universality was then built upon the ‘CONNECTing the dots’ conference outcome document on 3–4 March 2015. UNESCO's Deputy Director General, Mr. Getachew Engida, in closing the ‘CONNECTing the dots’ conference, stated: "The Internet and all new information and communication must be at the heart of the post-2015 sustainable development agenda - as a transformational force and a foundation for building the knowledge societies we need."

Wider context 
The social, civic and economic potential of a global Internet—one that bridges the world—is widely recognized. Connecting an individual, locality, nation or continent to the wealth of information, expertise and communities distributed across the globe is among the greatest promises of the Internet; for example, educational materials can now readily be put in the hands of students worldwide. However, the Internet can also empower users to create, disseminate, and consume information and knowledge resources. This potential for using the Internet to reconfigure access to information and knowledge, and also reshape freedom of expression, privacy, and ethical norms and behavior, has been a theme in academic research. Include the interconnected information and communication technologies, such as the Web, social media, developing mobile Internet, and the Internet of Things (IoT), including such developments as cloud computing, big data, and robotics, for example, that are increasingly central to networked technologies. Biometrics and other technologies central to developing network applications, such as for personal identification and security, are also incorporated in this definition.

By 2014, over three billion people had gained access to the Internet from around the world. This is a major advance in worldwide access to information and knowledge, but translates to only 42 per cent of the world, leaving most of the world without access. Even those with access are often constrained by technical barriers, language barriers, skills deficits and many other social and policy factors, from accessing information and knowledge in essential ways. The global diffusion of the Internet is progressing, but at the same time what we know as the Internet is continually changing. Innovation continues apace in many areas, from mobile applications and payment systems to social media and Information and Communication Technologies (ICT). The Internet has reached more people in more powerful ways than ever thought possible. It has also become a major resource for economic development.

Internet Universality Principles: R-O-A-M 
The R-O-A-M principles are a theoretical framework for assessing the state of play of each key fields of Internet policy. The framework underscores a set of principles that, when applied to the Internet, aim to achieve an open, global and secure Internet, by highlighting the relevance of human rights as a whole, as well as openness, accessibility and multi-stakeholder participation.

Rights-based 
The Internet is becoming so significant in everyday life, work and identity in much of the world, that it is increasingly difficult to distinguish human rights on and off the Internet. UNESCO and the United Nations more broadly have affirmed the principle of human rights should apply to all aspects of the Internet. This would include, for example, freedom of expression, and privacy. UNESCO considers that as these two rights should also apply to the Internet, so should other rights, such as cultural diversity, gender equality, and education. As human rights are indivisible, for UNESCO all these rights mentioned above also need to be balanced with rights that apply to both digital and extra-digital life.

Openness 
This general principle, applied to the Internet, encompasses open global standards, interoperability, open application interfaces, and open science, documents, text, data, and flows. Social and political support for open systems, not only technical expertise, is part of this principle. Transparency is part of openness, as well as a dimension of the rights to seek and receive information. Making rights and openness are interdependent.

Accessibility 
There is special relevance to the Internet of the broader principle of social inclusion. This puts forward the role of accessibility in overcoming digital divides, digital inequalities, and exclusions based on skills, literacy, language, gender or disability. It also points to the need for sustainable business models for Internet activity, and to trust in the preservation, quality, integrity, security, and authenticity of information and knowledge. Accessibility is interlinked to rights and openness.

Multi-stakeholders participation 

The general principle of participation in decision-making that impacts on the lives of individuals has been part of the Internet from its outset, accounting for much of its success. It recognizes the value of multi-stakeholder participation, incorporating users and a user-centric perspective as well as all other actors critical to developing, using and governing the Internet across a range of levels. The other principles are enriched by the multi-stakeholder participation principle, because it states that everyone should have a stake in the future of the Internet.

It is possible to define a number of broad categories of stakeholders in the Internet, with subgroups as well: State, businesses and industries, non-governmental actors, civil society, international governmental organization, research actors, individuals, and others. Each of these categories has more or less unique stakes in the future of the Internet, but there are also areas of great overlap and interdependence. For instance, some NGOs, are likely to prioritize the promotion of human rights; meanwhile parliaments are primary actors in defining laws to protect these rights. Still other stakeholders are key to shaping rights online, such as search engine providers, and Internet Service Providers (ISPs). Individuals also have particular roles to play in respecting, promoting and protecting rights.

Cross-cutting factors 
Aside from the four main factors (R-O-A-M), UNESCO has also identified five different cross-cutting factors that will suit all of the R-O-A-M factors, and should be taken into consideration. Of the five, two of them are concerned with gender and age equality, one is concerned with sustainable development (i.e. what part does the internet play in achieving the Sustainable Development Goals developed by the UN), the fourth is concerned with internet trust and security, and the last is concerned with legal and ethical properties of the internet.

Internet Universality Indicators 
UNESCO has been developing Internet Universality indicators - based on the ROAM principles - to help governments and other stakeholders to assess their own national Internet environments and to promote the values associated with Internet Universality. The research process was envisioned to include consultations at a range of global forums and a written questionnaire sent to key actors, but also a series of publications on important Internet Freedom related issues as encryption, hate speech online, privacy, digital safety and journalism sources. The outcome of this multidimensional research was publicized in June 2018. The final indicators were to be submitted to the UNESCO Member States in the International Program for Development of Communication (IPDC) for endorsement.

The indicators are divided into three different groups: quantitative indicators, qualitative indicators and institutional indicators (which concerns constitutional and legal arrangements). This has raised questions about the credibility of the indicators, as well as the difficulty of actually carrying out the research. Due to differences in data availability, it could be difficult to give a fair assessment to all indicators for all countries involved. However, in their draft UNESCO believes that the range and diversity of indicators included in the framework should enable the indicators to provide sufficient evidence of the Internet environment as a whole. Other challenges that it faces include different definitions of terms like 'broadband', as well as the fact that most of the data is held by private companies and is not publicly available as a result.

The Four Major Fields of Focus

Access to Information and Knowledge 
Access to information and knowledge encompasses the vision of universal access, not only to the Internet, but also to the ability to seek and receive open scientific, indigenous, and traditional knowledge online, and also produce content in all forms. This requires initiatives for freedom of information and the building of open and preserved knowledge resources, as well as a respect for cultural and linguistic diversity that fosters local content in multiple languages, quality educational opportunities for all, including new media literacy and skills, and social inclusion online, including addressing inequalities based on income, skills, education, gender, age, race, ethnicity, or accessibility by those with disabilities.

Freedom of Expression 

Freedom of expression entails the ability to safely express one's views over the Internet, ranging from the rights of Internet users to freedom of expression online, through to press freedom and the safety of journalists, bloggers and human rights advocates, along with policies that enhance an open exchange of views and a respect for the rights of free online expression. Privacy refers broadly to Internet practices and policies that respect the rights of individuals to have a reasonable expectation of having a personal space, and to control access to their personal information. Privacy, therefore, allows individuals to freely express their ideas without fear of reprisals.

Privacy 

Privacy protection is however a tricky concept that goes together with the promotion of openness and transparency and a recognition that privacy and its protection underpins freedom of expression and trust in the Internet, and therefore its greater use for social and economic development.

Ethics 

Ethics considers whether the norms, rules and procedures that govern online behavior and the design of the Internet and related digital media are based on ethical principles anchored in human rights based principles and geared to protecting the dignity and safety of individuals in cyberspace and advance accessibility, openness, and inclusiveness on the Internet. For example, Internet use should be sensitive to ethical considerations, such as non-discrimination on the basis of gender, age or disabilities; and shaped by ethics rather than used to retrospectively justify practices and policies, placing a focus on the intentionality of actions, as well as on the outcomes of Internet policies and practices.

Challenges to Internet Universality 

As the World Wide Web and related digital media have evolved, they have come to serve many diverse purposes for many different actors, e.g. household entertainment, government surveillance. Technical innovations are altering traditional business models, such as in the provision of news, and the structure of organizations, where traditional hierarchical reporting relationships have been challenged by many-to-one and many-to-many networks of communication that span organizational boundaries.

Policy 

As digital media have been a force behind the convergence of formerly more distinct technologies of the post, telephone, and mass media, so policy and regulation have often failed to keep up, as we can see with the lack of a clear and unified regulation policy used by social media. This has left potentially inappropriate regulations in place and failed to integrate new solutions such as Media and information literacy. A worldwide ecology of policies and regulations is shaping the interrelated local and global outcomes of the Internet on access to information and knowledge, freedom of expression, privacy and ethics. And such policy choices are being considered by a multiplicity of actors at all levels for all are concerned that the policies and practices governing the Internet could undermine principles and purposes they view as fundamental, whether those values are centered on freedom of expression, the privacy of personal information, or ethical conduct, and whether the implications are perceived to be immediate or long term.

Blocking, Filtering and Content Regulation 
Blocking and filtering of content regulation are common areas of concern for NGO's and International Organizations, such as UNESCO. These measures restrict in a direct way citizens’ rights to impart information and opinion, as well as impacting adversely on their rights to access online content. In many cases, users might not realize that content has been filtered or blocked. There was some recognition that alongside censorship as a violation of free expression, there is also legitimate reason in some contexts to block certain content, such as material that incites violence. This raises the question of how to draw the line in specific cases about what to block, for how long, in what proportion, and with what transparency and redress mechanism.

Another issue is the danger of holding intermediaries liable as if they were publishers—for example, making social media platforms responsible for an alleged case of hate speech. International standards of human rights law mean that removal, blockage or filtering of Internet content should be the exception to the norm of free flow of information, and that such actions fulfill the conditions of due purpose, necessity, proportionality, and transparency, and are authorized under relevant law and policy. Furthermore, multiple actors, including individual users can identify instances of censorship and expose these cases to the court of public opinion. In such ways, the Internet has the potential for enabling individual Internet users to hold institutions and other users more accountable for their actions online, creating what has been called a ‘Fifth Estate’, analogous to the Fourth Estate of the press, but potentially even more powerful. A Fifth Estate does require a relatively free and open Internet to be sustainable and influential.

User Targeting and Profiling 
Governments or commercial enterprises have the ability to target individual users, putting their privacy in danger, given that they will know much about their interests through their search or other online activities. Individual users of social media platforms can advertise to others who are interested in particular topics. This can appear more as a violation of privacy then the exercise of free speech. A related issue is the ‘filter bubble’: the idea that different Internet users will see different versions of the Internet, based on how algorithms use their previous search or social media preferences. User targeting can happen at the level of the government, private companies, or even at the infrastructural level.

Expression and Identification 
The dependence of freedom of expression on related issues of privacy, anonymity, and encryption that face an apparent resistance to change.

Anonymity 
Anonymity can be a cornerstone of privacy; it is considered as a prerequisite for the expression of unpopular or critical speech. Anonymity is sometimes viewed as contributing to harmful speech, such as hate speech, which goes beyond international standards of human rights law for protected speech. Despite this perception, academic research has not established that removing anonymity and requiring the identification of speakers would be a cure to insensitive or hurtful remarks. These incivilities are often fostered by a larger set of circumstances, such as a failure of users sitting at a computer to fully realize that they are communicating with a real person. Anonymity may also impact on public debate online. In some countries, participants would refrain from participating (for instance on the issue of gay rights or domestic abuse) for fear of identification and persecution. Anonymity in cyber-attacks, including fake domain attacks impersonating civil society, is a serious violation of free expression.

Data protection and surveillance 
Data protection can be critical to free expression. Increasing government surveillance of citizens, including through the collection and analysis of ‘big data’, is leading to an erosion of the citizens' rights to privacy and freedom of expression. A report of the former UN Special Rapporteur on Freedom of Opinion and Expression states that, bulk access to all digital communications traffic eradicates the possibility of individualized proportionality analysis, because it pre-empts prior authorization based on specific targeted suspicion. The role of mass surveillance potentials and the use of big data analytics could change the balance between the state and individuals. Whistleblower, such as Edward Snowden, helped identifying the mass surveillance of communications metadata, as a disproportionate response in relation to the security problem. Concern were also expressed during the ‘CONNECTing the dots’ conference about surveillance tools, originally built to address severe crimes, being used to collect personal information about dissidents, or sometimes from all citizens. Further concerns were over weak transparency on how data is collected or used for security investigations. Manipulation of security practices such as the introduction of ‘back doors’ into software, to allow legitimate government access can leave Internet users vulnerable to other, illegitimate threats. Attackers can potentially get in through the same back doors, rendering systems less secure.

Jurisdictional Issues 
There are a certain number of obstacles in maintaining and promoting the rights to freedom of expression via regulation and regulatory frameworks. Due to its globalized and borderless nature, the Internet can be seen as inherently unregulated. There is, for example, a difficulty in establishing effective state-based regulation in a world where content can be hosted and accessed from entirely different countries, leading to regulation becoming obsolete. Striking the correct regulatory balance is difficult, as over- or inappropriate regulation can have negative consequences not only for freedom of expression but for the value of the Internet in general. UNESCO considers that governments role is not to restrict freedoms, but rather to ensure that fundamental human rights—including communication-related rights—are protected. Paradoxically, a lack of regulation could be a detriment to the public interest. Internet-specific laws to protect freedom of expression could then be justified, since the Internet is so very different from any of the traditional media.

Sources

Notes

References 

Freedom of speech
Privacy
Internet governance